Kever may refer to:

 A tomb or grave
 Hein Kever (1854–1922), Dutch painter